The Walddrehna Solar Park is a 52.284 MW photovoltaic power station, which is located in Walddrehna, Brandenburg, Germany, on a former military base.

See also 

 List of photovoltaic power stations

References 

Photovoltaic power stations in Germany